The Daily Hai Nisai Stakes (Japanese デイリー杯2歳ステークス) is a Japanese Grade 2 flat horse race in Japan for two-year-old Thoroughbreds. It is run over a distance of 1600 metres at Kyoto Racecourse in November.

The Daily Hai Nisai Stakes was first run in 1966 and was elevated to Grade 2 status in 1984. It was usually run over 1400 metres until 1996. It serves as a trial race for the Asahi Hai Futurity Stakes and the Hopeful Stakes.

Winners since 2000 

 The 2020, 2021 and 2022 races took place at Hanshin Racecourse over a distance of 1600 metres.

Earlier winners

 1984 - Tanino Bouquet
 1985 - Yamanin Falcon
 1986 - Dyna Thank You
 1987 - Daitaku Longchamp
 1988 - Idol Marie
 1989 - Yamanin Global
 1990 - Northern Driver
 1991 - Yamanin Global
 1992 - Biwa Hawahide
 1993 - Bodyguard
 1994 - Maxim Charade
 1995 - Rose Colour
 1996 - Seeking The Pearl
 1997 - Bold Emperor
 1998 - Eishin Cameron
 1999 - Legend Hunter

See also
 Horse racing in Japan
 List of Japanese flat horse races

References

Turf races in Japan